Al-Wadiah (Arabic: الوديعة) is a small town in the Najran Province of Saudi Arabia.

History

Al-Wadiah War (1969) 

On 27 November 1969, PRSY regular army units advanced on, and took, the town of al-Wadiah. Saudi forces deployed in the region were limited to some tribal militias, backed by some aircraft and artillery. A small section of the PRSY force began advancing on Sharurah, but was halted.

At 0945 in the morning, the Saudi ground offensive began advancing on Yemeni positions on two axes: A battalion of Saudi National Guard units, along with some other forces, advanced on Yemeni positions from the West. A second group, composed of exiled Yemenis and Saudi border guards, advanced on Yemeni positions from the east.

During the attack PRSY forces were divided into two pockets. A PRSY counterattack failed to unite the pockets. The following day clashes began at dawn, and continued throughout the day. The commander of the PRSY Brigade was killed in the fighting, following which PRSY forces began to withdraw. Saudi forces harassed PRSY forces during the retreat, although stopped at the border under orders.

References 

Najran Province

Cities in Saudi Arabia